Morales is a town and municipality in the Cauca Department, Colombia.

References

Municipalities of Cauca Department